A parliamentary election was held in the Philippines on April 7, 1978, for the election of the 165 regional representatives to the Interim Batasang Pambansa (the nation's first parliament). The elections were participated in by the leading opposition party, the Lakas ng Bayan (LABAN), which had twenty-one candidates for the Metro Manila area while the leading candidate was the jailed opposition leader Ninoy Aquino, and the Marcos regime's party known as the Kilusang Bagong Lipunan (KBL), which was led by the then-First Lady Imelda Marcos. Ninoy was allowed to run by his fellow partymates under the Liberal Party, who boycotted the election and was not allowed to campaign, and so his family campaigned for him. The night before the election on April 6, 1978, a noise barrage was organized by the supporters of (LABAN) which occurred up to dawn.

These elections were followed by the sectoral election on April 27, which elected additional 14 representatives. Another 10 representatives were appointed, bringing up the total number of representatives to 189.

Background 
The Philippines had been under martial law since 1972, with incumbent president Ferdinand Marcos ruling by decree. Prior to this, the Constitution of the Philippines was being drafted by the Constitutional Convention, whose delegates were elected in 1970. The Constitutional Convention approved the final draft of the constitution, which consisted of the abolition of the Philippine Congress and its replacement with an interim National Assembly consisting of the President, the Vice-President, the President of the Constitutional Convention, and members of the Senate and the House of Representatives in November 1972 and was later ratified on January 17, 1973, through so-called "citizens' assemblies". The Constitution was amended twice, on July 27–28, 1973 and February 27–28, 1975. The Constitution was amended once again on October 16–17, 1976 with the passage of "Amendment No. 6", which changed the name of the Interim National Assembly into the "Interim Batasang Pambansa", more commonly as the "Batasan".

Campaign

Lakas ng Bayan 

In 1978, from his prison cell, Aquino was allowed to take part in the elections. Although his friends, former Senators Gerry Roxas and Jovito Salonga, preferred to boycott the elections, Aquino urged his supporters to field 21 candidates in Metro Manila. Thus, his political party, dubbed Lakas ng Bayan ("People's Power"), was born. The party's acronym was "LABAN" ("fight" in Tagalog). He was entitled to one television interview on GTV's Face the Nation (hosted by Ronnie Nathanielsz), and proved to a startled and impressed populace that imprisonment had neither dulled his rapier-like tongue nor dampened his fighting spirit. Foreign correspondents and diplomats asked what would happen to the LABAN ticket. People agreed with him that his party would win overwhelmingly in an honest election. On April 6, 1978, supporters of the Lakas ng Bayan (LABAN), the opposition party headed by former Senator Benigno Aquino Jr. who was still in jail and twenty other candidates contesting the Region IV-A (Metro Manila) seats, came out in protest by asking bystanders and cars to make noise in support the opposition.

Kilusang Bagong Lipunan 
President Marcos created the Kilusang Bagong Lipunan (New Society Movement) as his political vehicle for the elections.

Results

District elections

Sectoral election 
A separate election was held for the 14 members of the Batasang Pambansa's sectoral representatives.

This was via electoral college, with youth, industrial labor and agricultural labor as the three sectors. Each sector shall elect among themselves an electoral council, the members coming from provinces and cities. Each electoral council elected two members from Luzon, and a member each from Visayas and Mindanao, with two additional seats from the youth sector elected at-large, for a total of 14 seats.

Allegations of fraud 
Marcos said that fraud was committed by "both sides" during the elections, but not on a scale that would have affected the results. Jovito Salonga disagreed with the assessment and said that he did not observe people celebrating KBL’s victory because they felt "like they’ve been cheated."

See also 
 Commission on Elections
 Politics of the Philippines
 Philippine elections
 Interim Batasang Pambansa

References

Further reading 
 Philippine Commission on Elections — Records and Statistics Division
 Philippine House of Representatives Congressional Library

External links 
 Official website of the Commission on Elections

1978
1978 elections in the Philippines